Lars Mikael Åkerfeldt (born 17 April 1974) is a Swedish musician. He is the lead vocalist, guitarist, and primary songwriter of progressive metal band Opeth, and the former vocalist of death metal supergroup Bloodbath. He was also guitarist for the "one-off" band Steel, and is part of the collaboration Storm Corrosion with Steven Wilson.

Åkerfeldt is known for his progressive rock-influenced songwriting style and his frequent use of both clean baritone and growled vocals. Åkerfeldt was ranked #42 out of 100 Greatest Heavy Metal Guitarists of All Time by Guitar World, and #11 among "The Top 25 Modern Metal Guitarists" on MetalSucks.

Career

A native of Stockholm, Mikael Åkerfeldt was the vocalist for Eruption, a death metal band that he formed in 1987 at 13 years old. After Eruption came to an end in 1989, he joined Opeth, ostensibly as a keyboardist. When their original bassist left Opeth two years later, Åkerfeldt replaced him as bassist; Isberg then assumed guitar duties. When Isberg left Opeth three years later, Åkerfeldt replaced him as the vocalist.

Åkerfeldt performed the death vocals on Katatonia's album Brave Murder Day and their EP Sounds of Decay.

Åkerfeldt revealed in September 2009 that he is contemplating recording a singer-songwriter acoustic solo album.
However, in 2014 he expressed the view that he didn't have the need for a special solo project and that he can put pretty much anything into Opeth.

In an interview on STIM magazine, he revealed that one of the highlights of his career was Opeth's performance at the Royal Albert Hall.

In 2020, Åkerfeldt was approached by director Jonas Åkerlund to compose the soundtrack for the swedish six-part Netflix series Clark, released in May 2022. It is his first foray into film scoring.

Influences
Åkerfeldt is a collector of obscure 1970s rock and heavy metal albums. He also tends to show his influence from these obscure bands, making reference to them in Opeth album titles such as Blackwater Park, Still Life and My Arms, Your Hearse, as well as songs such as "Master's Apprentices" and "Goblin". He is also influenced extensively by jazz, the musician Ritchie Blackmore, Magma and its founder Christian Vander, and Hideki Ishima.

When asked what the album was that 'made him a metalhead', Åkerfeldt answered that it was probably The Number of the Beast by Iron Maiden, but also mentioned Lick It Up by Kiss. In a different interview he stated that he usually cites Black Sabbath's Sabbath Bloody Sabbath as the best (and favourite) heavy metal album of all time. He also has considered Judas Priest's Sad Wings of Destiny as his favourite metal album.

Personal life
On 15 August 2003, Mikael Åkerfeldt married his longtime girlfriend, Anna. In 2004 Anna gave birth to their first daughter, Melinda. The couple had their second daughter, Mirjam, in 2007. In 2016, in an interview with The Quietus, Åkerfeldt revealed he had gone through a divorce. 

Åkerfeldt is known to be friends with Steven Wilson, the frontman of one of his favorite bands, Porcupine Tree, who also produced the Opeth albums Blackwater Park, Deliverance and Damnation; Mike Portnoy, former drummer of Dream Theater (who is featured in their music video for Wither); and Jonas Renkse of Katatonia. He is also presumed to be the basis for the character Toki Wartooth from the popular cartoon Metalocalypse, as divulged in an interview with Ultimate Guitar. Åkerfeldt doesn't practice any religion and considers himself an atheist.

Equipment
Åkerfeldt has almost exclusively used PRS guitars since the Deliverance/Damnation era and has his own signature model.  He also occasionally uses guitars by a variety of other brands as well, including Gibson and Jackson.

Electric guitars
Åkerfeldt uses the following electric guitars, according to the Opeth website.

 PRS SE Mikael Åkerfeldt Signature Guitar
 PRS P24 (Antique White)
 PRS Custom 24 (Tortoiseshell flame top)
 PRS Custom 24 (Blue Flame Top)
 PRS Custom 24 (Black Quilt)
 PRS Custom 24 (Black)
 PRS SC 245 (Black Cherry) 
 PRS 22 fret Modern Eagle (Grey Flame Top)
 PRS Modern Eagle Single Cut 24 Fret (Wine Flame Matte Top)
 PRS Custom 22 12-String (Black)
 PRS Singlecut (Black Quilt)
 PRS Starla (Vintage Cherry)
 Gibson Flying V ('67 Reissue)
 Gibson  Les Paul Standard V.O.S. (Tobacco Sunburst)
 Gibson SG Standard 1961 Reissue
 Fender Stratocaster 1975 (Black)
 Fender Stratocaster 1972 Reissue (Natural) 
 Jackson RR USA Model
 B.C. Rich Mockingbird (Black)

Acoustic guitars/Steel string
Åkerfeldt uses the following acoustic guitars, according to the Opeth web site.
 Martin (with Fishman Pickup)
 Martin 00016GT
 Takamine 12 String
 Seagull (with Fishman Pickup)
 Martin 000-28

Acoustic guitars/Classical nylon
 Amalio Burguet 3am (cedar top) 
 Landola CT/2/w

Amps
Åkerfeldt uses the following amps, according to the Opeth web site.
 Marshall Vintage Modern 2466
 Laney GH100L with cabinet
 Laney VH100R
 Laney VC30
 Fender 1000 Rocpro
 Fractal Audio Axe-FX Ultra preamp / effects processor
Marshall JCM900

Discography

With Opeth
 Orchid (1995)
Morningrise (1996)
My Arms, Your Hearse (1998)
Still Life (1999)
Blackwater Park (2001)
Deliverance (2002)
Damnation (2003)
Lamentations (2003)
Ghost Reveries (2005)
The Roundhouse Tapes (2007)
Watershed (2008)
In Live Concert at the Royal Albert Hall (2010)
Heritage (2011)
Pale Communion (2014)
Sorceress (2016)
In Cauda Venenum (2019)

With Katatonia
 Brave Murder Day (1996) – harsh vocals
 Sounds of Decay (1997) – harsh vocals
 Discouraged Ones (1998) – backing vocals, co-production on vocals
 Tonight's Decision (1999) – additional vocal production
 Brave Yester Days (2004) – harsh vocals (on disc 2: tracks 1–6), additional vocal production (on disc 2: tracks 6–9)
 The Black Sessions (2005) – backing vocals, co-vocal production

With Bloodbath
 Breeding Death (2000, EP)
 Resurrection Through Carnage (2002)
 The Wacken Carnage (2008, CD/DVD)
 Unblessing the Purity (2008)
 The Fathomless Mastery (2008)
 Bloodbath over Bloodstock (2011, DVD)

With Edge of Sanity
 Crimson (1996)

With SteelHeavy Metal Machine (1998, EP)

With Storm Corrosion
 Storm Corrosion (2012)

As a Soloist/ComposerClark (Soundtrack From The Netflix Series) (2022, OST Album) (including clean jukebox-like fore-/background vocals from track 28)

Appearances
 Ayreon: Åkerfeldt sings the parts of "Fear" in The Human Equation, the 2004 release.
 Candlemass: Åkerfeldt performs vocals for one song on the Candlemass 20-year anniversary DVD.
 Devin Townsend: Åkerfeldt appeared as a guest vocalist for Deconstruction. He sings on the song "Stand".
 Dream Theater: Åkerfeldt performs a spoken word part in "Repentance" on their 2007 album Systematic Chaos. He also sang the second verse of the same song on its first live performance, during the Progressive Nation 2008 tour. During the same tour he also performed the growled part of the song "A Nightmare to Remember" with the band live.
 Edge of Sanity: Åkerfeldt provided vocals and guitar parts in Edge of Sanity's 1996 album Crimson, and also wrote lyrics for a song on Infernal.
Ghost: Prequelle (2018) – acoustic guitar on the instrumental track "Helvetesfönster".
 Horrified: Åkerfeldt growls a few words on "Avatar of the Age of Horus" off of their Deus Diabolus Inversus album.
 Katatonia: Åkerfeldt sings on the 1996 album Brave Murder Day, and the three-song EP Sounds of Decay, released 1997. He also performs backing vocals on the album Discouraged Ones and was the vocal producer on Tonight's Decision. 
 Ihsahn: Åkerfeldt performs on the song "Unhealer" from the 2008 album angL. OSI: Åkerfeldt performs lead vocals on the track "Stockholm" for OSI's 2009 album, Blood.
 Porcupine Tree: Åkerfeldt sings backing vocals on "Deadwing", "Lazarus", "Shesmovedon" and "Arriving Somewhere But Not Here" and plays a guitar solo on "Arriving Somewhere But Not Here" on the 2005 album Deadwing.
 Roadrunner United: Åkerfeldt performs vocals on the song "Roads" alongside Type O Negative keyboardist Josh Silver on the Roadrunner Records 25th Anniversary album Roadrunner United: The All-Star Sessions.
 Soilwork: Åkerfeldt performs vocals on the title track of the album A Predator's Portrait.
Steve Hackett: Genesis Revisited II'' (2012) – vocals on "Supper's Ready".

References

External links
 Biographies of Unique Musical Figures on LEBmetal.com

 Opeth official website

1974 births
20th-century Swedish male singers
21st-century Swedish male singers
Bloodbath members
Death metal musicians
English-language singers from Sweden
Katatonia members
Lead guitarists
Living people
Opeth members
OSI (band) members
Progressive metal guitarists
Rhythm guitarists
Singers from Stockholm
Steel (band) members
Swedish atheists
Swedish baritones
Swedish heavy metal singers
Swedish heavy metal guitarists